Emmelichthyops atlanticus, the bonnetmouth, is a marine fish species of grunt native to the western Atlantic Ocean, where it occurs from Florida and the Bahamas to northern South America.  This species is the only known member of its genus.

Description
Bonnetmouths are generally yellowish gray, with some blue anteriorly, with silvery-white on the sides. Adults also have four brown stripes on the upper halves (one mid-dorsal) of their bodies, while juveniles have only three. These stripes are usually more evident anteriorly; they become more faded near the tail.

Distribution and habitat
Found only in the western Atlantic Ocean, bonnetmouths can be seen from southern Florida and the Bahamas to northern South America. They can be captured most often near the Florida Keys, US Virgin Islands, and the Bahamas. The type specimens were both collected off the Bahamas' Cat Island.  They are generally associated with reefs and can be found over coral heads in small groups. Bonnetmouths can be found at depths from 3–90 m, but mainly occur in schools at about 64 m. It feeds on invertebrates and small fishes.

Systematics
Emmelichthyops atlanticus was first formally described in 1945 by the American ichthyologist Leonard Peter Schultz (1901-1986) with the type locality given as Cat Island in the Bahamas. It was formerly placed in the family Inermiidae. The generic name, Emmelichthyops, means “like Emmelichthys”. At the time of its description this species was thought to be related to Emmelichthys and the two at a are similar.

References

External links

Haemulinae
Fish of the Atlantic Ocean
Monotypic fish genera
Fish described in 1945